Lou Young may refer to:

Lou Young (cornerback) (born 1991), American football cornerback
Lou Young (American football coach) (1894–1948), American football coach